Mansfield is a city in Newton County, Georgia, United States. As of the 2020 census, the city had a population of 442.

History
Early variant names were "Bob Lee" and "Carmel". A post office called "Mansfield" has been in operation since 1897. The Georgia General Assembly incorporated Mansfield as a town in 1903.

Geography

Demographics

As of the census of 2000, there were 392 people, 132 households, and 105 families residing in the city. The racial makeup of the city was 78.06% White, 21.17% African American, and 0.77% from two or more races.

There were 132 households, out of which 33.3% had children under the age of 18 living with them, 67.4% were married couples living together, 9.8% had a female householder with no husband present, and 19.7% were non-families. 16.7% of all households were made up of individuals, and 9.1% had someone living alone who was 65 years of age or older. The average household size was 2.49 and the average family size was 2.75.

In the city, the population was spread out, with 19.1% under the age of 18, 6.4% from 18 to 24, 26.5% from 25 to 44, 21.2% from 45 to 64, and 26.8% who were 65 years of age or older. The median age was 43 years. For every 100 females, there were 88.5 males. For every 100 females age 18 and over, there were 81.1 males.

The median income for a household in the city was $34,167, and the median income for a family was $37,813. Males had a median income of $31,250 versus $23,542 for females. The per capita income for the city was $15,402. About 11.7% of families and 10.2% of the population were below the poverty line, including 7.0% of those under age 18 and 25.0% of those age 65 or over.

References

Cities in Georgia (U.S. state)
Cities in Newton County, Georgia